The APR-3E airborne light ASW acoustic homing torpedo is designed by Russian Tactical Missiles Corporation JSC to engage current and future submarines at depth from the surface down to 800 metres at speed of up to 43+ knots, and it is a replacement for earlier APR-2 light antisubmarine acoustic homing torpedo.

APR-3E airborne light antisubmarine acoustic homing torpedo is designed to be carried by a various fixed wing and rotary wing platforms including Tu-142, Il-38, Ka-28 and other aircraft. The torpedo requires at least 100 metres depth of water for the initial air-drop and can be deployed in conditions up to sea state 6.

Once entering water, the control surfaces of the torpedo enable the torpedo to travel in a spiral path with the help of gravity without starting the engine.  During this stage, the acoustic seeker of the torpedo searches for targets.  Once the target is identified, the engine starts and solid propellant rocket engine ensures the target has virtually very little or no time to react, thus increasing the kill probability.

Newest version of this torpedo is the APR-3M, with modified characteristics. Trials of the APR-3M missile have been completed, the process of its serial production has been organized and its deliveries to the Ministry of Defence of Russia are underway as of May 2019.

Users: Russia purchased a small number of APR-3 for its navy, while China was reported to be the first export customer when APR-3E was part of the Chinese Be-200 ASW aircraft purchase package.

Specifications
Designation: APR-3E light ASW torpedo (Manufacturer calls the weapon as a missile instead)
Manufacturer: Region Scientific and Production Enterprise JSC division of the Tactical Missiles Corporation Joint Stock Co.
Speed: > 56 kn
Range: > 3 km
Diameter: 350 mm
Length: 3.685 m
Weight: 525 kg (another 25 kg for accessory for aircraft deployment)
Propulsion: solid-propellant rocket-powered turbo-waterjet
Fuze: impact and proximity
Warhead: 74 kg
Seeker: acoustic
Seeker range: 1.5 km – 2 km
Maximum target speed: > 43 kn

See also
 A244-S - Italian equivalent
 Mark 54 Lightweight Torpedo - US Navy's equivalent
 MU90 Impact - French/Italian equivalent
 Sting Ray (torpedo) - British equivalent
 TAL Shyena - Indian equivalent
 Yu-7 torpedo - Chinese equivalent
 K745 Chung Sang Eo - South Korean equivalent
 Type 97 light weight torpedo (G-RX4) - Japanese equivalent

References

 APR-3E
 "Development of Rocket Torpedoes" Geoff Kirby (2000)

Torpedoes of Russia
Aerial torpedoes
Tactical Missiles Corporation products
Military equipment introduced in the 2000s